The Omaha & Southern Interurban Railway Company built and operated around 1907 an interurban railway from South Omaha, Nebraska, to Belleview College and Fort Crook,  south.

Route 
The chosen route required a large amount of grading. For the entire length of the line cuts averaged about 40,000 cu. yds. per mile ( per km), and for several miles the road was a succession of cuts and fills. Owing to the peculiar holding qualities of the clay in which the cuts were made, the slope of the banks was made ¼ to 1, which is quite in contrast to the practice of 1½ to 1 elsewhere. R. N. Towl, of Omaha was in charge of the construction.

This fort was a government post, and usually four or five companies were stationed at it. Oak ties and 70-lb. per yard (35 kg/m) rails were used.

Electric infrastructure 
Span trolley construction was employed. The butts were treated with a tar compound, the bi-product obtained in the manufacture of artificial gas. A lightning arrester was installed every quarter mile. 

Initially, power was obtained direct from the direct-current power house of the Omaha & Council Bluffs Street 
Railway Company. The booster set consisted of two 100-kW Edison bi-polar generators. The winding of the one serving as a motor was unchanged. The voltage of the other has been halved and the amperage doubled by connecting the armature leads so as to give two independent circuits paralleled by the brushes. Plans contemplated a sub-station in South Omaha for the city lines and power for the interurban line to be obtained from this.

Operation 
An hourly service was ordinarily maintained by one car, but during the summer season three were scheduled to be operated. They were maintained in the shops of the Omaha & Council Bluffs Street Railway.

See also 
 Omaha Southern Railway

References 

South Omaha, Nebraska
Interurban railways in Nebraska
Streetcars articles needing expert attention